Tiexiguangchang is an interchange station on lines 1 and 9 of the Shenyang Metro. The line 1 station opened on 27 September 2010, and the line 9 station opened on 25 May 2019.

Station Layout

References 

Railway stations in China opened in 2010
Shenyang Metro stations